Amazing Stories is an American anthology television series created by Steven Spielberg, that originally ran on NBC in the United States from September 29, 1985 to April 10, 1987.

The series was nominated for 12 Emmy Awards and won five. The first season episode "The Amazing Falsworth" earned writer Mick Garris an Edgar Award for Best Episode in a TV Series. It was not a ratings hit (ranking 40th in Season 1 and 52nd in Season 2), however, and the network did not renew it after the two-year contract expired. The 1987 science fiction film Batteries Not Included was originally intended as a story for Amazing Stories, but Spielberg liked the idea so much that he decided to make it a theatrical release.

The series title licensed the name of Amazing Stories, the first dedicated science fiction magazine created by Hugo Gernsback in April 1926.

The title sequence was made by computer-generated imagery (CGI) firm, Robert Abel and Associates.

On March 6, 2020, a revival of Amazing Stories premiered on Apple TV+.

Episodes
All episodes have a running time of around 24 minutes, with the exceptions of "The Mission" and "Go to the Head of the Class" (both running 46 minutes).

Season 1 (1985–86)

Season 2 (1986–87)

Soundtrack
In 1999, Varèse Sarabande released a CD containing a rerecording of the scores for the episodes "The Mission" and "Dorothy and Ben" (John Williams and Georges Delerue respectively) plus Williams' opening and closing themes, performed by the Royal Scottish National Orchestra and conducted by Joel McNeely.

In 2006–2007, Intrada released three volumes of original music from the series, covering the impressive lineup of composers who worked on it and featuring all of the most noteworthy scores (with the exception of Danny Elfman and Steve Bartek's "The Family Dog," because the masters could not be found – a brief suite is on Music for a Darkened Theatre: Vol. 2, however), as well as two alternate versions of Williams' main title theme, one used just once (Alternate #1, on "Alamo Jobe") and the other never used. The album is also notable for the premiere release of the music Williams composed for the Amblin Entertainment logo (although the logo music is not heard on the show itself).

Other than Williams, Bruce Broughton and Billy Goldenberg are the only composers to be represented on all three volumes. The running times below indicate the cumulative time for each score rather than the time of each track. (The series theme is not quoted in any of the episode scores, with the exception of "Ghost Train.")

Volume 1 (2006)

CD1:
 Amazing Stories Main Title – John Williams (1:02)
 Ghost Train – John Williams (15:45)
 Alamo Jobe – James Horner (10:01)
 Gather Ye Acorns – Bruce Broughton (18:37)
 The Doll – Georges Delerue (10:09)
 The Amazing Falsworth – Billy Goldenberg (8:47)

CD2:
 Amazing Stories Bumper #1 – John Williams  (:04)
 Moving Day – David Shire (13:41)
 Without Diana – Georges Delerue (12:39)
 Mummy, Daddy – Danny Elfman & Steve Bartek (13:26)
 Vanessa in the Garden – Lennie Niehaus (13:23)
 Welcome to My Nightmare – Bruce Broughton (16:04)
 Amazing Stories End Credits – John Williams (:29)
 Amblin Logo – John Williams (:15)

Volume Two (2006)

CD 1:
 Amazing Stories Main Title Alternate #1 – John Williams (1:03)
 Boo! – Jerry Goldsmith (12:13)
 What If...? – Billy Goldenberg (12:32)
 Dorothy and Ben – Georges Delerue (10:10)
 The Main Attraction – Craig Safan (12:09)
 Such Interesting Neighbors – David Newman (17:13)
 Thanksgiving – Bruce Broughton (12:14)

CD 2:
 Amazing Stories Bumper #2 – John Williams  (:04)
 Hell Toupee – David Shire (13:41)
 One for the Road – Johnny Mandel (8:40)
 The Remote Control Man – Arthur B. Rubinstein (12:53)
 The Greibble – John Addison (15:43)
 No Day at the Beach – Leonard Rosenman (11:04)
 Santa '85 – Thomas Newman (13:05)
 Amazing Stories End Credits – John Williams (:29)
 Amblin Logo (Christmas Version) – John Williams (:15)

Volume Three (2007)

CD 1:
 Amazing Stories Main Title Alternate #2 – John Williams (1:03)
 Go to the Head of the Class – Alan Silvestri (26:58)
 The Wedding Ring – Craig Safan (12:51)
 Mirror, Mirror – Michael Kamen (24:56)
 Mr. Magic – Bruce Broughton (12:50)

CD 2:
 Amazing Stories Bumper #1 – John Williams  (:04)
 Secret Cinema – Billy Goldenberg (7:56)
 Life on Death Row – Fred Steiner (13:57)
 The Pumpkin Competition – John Addison (14:29)
 Grandpa's Ghost – Pat Metheny (11:06)
 The Mission – John Williams (29:55)
 Amazing Stories End Credits – John Williams (:29)
 Amblin Logo (Alternate) – John Williams (:15)

Reception

The series gained a number of positive reviews. However, some reviewers were unimpressed with the show, with Jeff Jarvis of People saying "Amazing Stories is one of the worst disappointments I've ever had watching TV."

Primetime Emmy Awards

Spin-offs
One episode of the show, "Family Dog", was spun off into its own series. Six years after Amazing Stories finished its run, Family Dog ran on CBS for ten episodes before being pulled off the schedule.

The video game The Dig originated as an idea Spielberg had for Amazing Stories, but decided it would be too expensive to film.

In 1986, Steven Bauer wrote two novelizations of the series which were both published by Charter Books in the US and Futura Books in the UK. The first book, Steven Spielberg's Amazing Stories (October 1986), adapted episodes 5, 12, 9, 2, 7 and 12, while the second book, Volume II of Steven Spielberg's Amazing Stories (December 1986), adapted episodes 7, 20, 8, 11, 18, 25, 4, 3, 21, 17 and 19.

In 1985–86, TSR published six tie-in novels under the Amazing Stories banner.  They were branching (Choose Your Own Adventure style) books where the reader chose where to jump at key points.

 The 4-D Funhouse by Clayton Emery and Earl Wajenberg.  Cover by Jeff Easley. 
 Jaguar! by Morris Simon.  Cover by Jeff Easley. 
 Portrait in Blood by Mary L. Kirchoff (credited as Mary Kirchoff).  Cover by Jeff Easley. 
 Nightmare Universe by Gene DeWeese and Robert Coulson.  Cover by Jeff Easley. 
 Starskimmer by John Betancourt.  Cover by Doug Chaffee.
 Day of the Mayfly by Lee Enderlin.  Cover by Doug Chaffee.

The 1987 film Batteries Not Included was originally planned to be a segment for the series, but Spielberg thought the story would work better on the big screen instead of television.

Reboot

On October 23, 2015, it was announced that NBC was developing a reboot of the series with Bryan Fuller writing the pilot episode and executive producing alongside Justin Falvey and Darryl Frank. Production companies involved with the series were set to include Universal Television. Steven Spielberg was not expected to be involved with the new series. On May 5, 2017, NBC and Universal Television were formally notified that their option rights to the Amazing Stories properties had been withdrawn.  Rights for the development of a genre television series under the name Amazing Stories were subsequently sold to Experimenter Media LLC.

On October 10, 2017, it was announced that Apple Inc. made a deal with Steven Spielberg's Amblin Television and NBC Universal to develop a new, ten-episode series on Apple's streaming service, Apple TV+. On February 7, 2018, it was announced that Fuller had stepped down as showrunner of the series over creative differences. It was further reported that it was unclear whether he would have a different role on the project going forward. He had not delivered a script to Apple before his amicable departure. Later that day, it was also announced that executive producer Hart Hanson was exiting the series as well. On May 22, 2018, it was announced that Once Upon a Time creators Edward Kitsis and Adam Horowitz had joined the production as executive producers and showrunners.

Home media

VHS
A selection of the original series episodes were released in the VHS format in 1993; these were titled "Book One" through "Book Five" in the US. In Japan and Europe episodes were cut together as movies and released in 8 volumes during the late 1980s, early 1990s. A three-tape VHS (PAL) set was released in the UK in 2001.

Europe/Japan VHS series
 Amazing Stories: The Movie (1987) - contains "The Mission", "Mummy Daddy" and "Go To The Head Of The Class"
 Amazing Stories II (1987) - contains "The Amazing Falsworth", "Ghost Train" and "The Wedding Ring"
 Amazing Stories III (1988) - contains "The Griebble", "Moving Day" and "Miscalculation"
 Amazing Stories IV (1988) - contains "Dorothy And Ben", "Family Dog" and "The Main Attraction"
 Amazing Stories V (1989) - contains "The Doll", "Thanksgiving" and "Life On Death Row"
 Amazing Stories VI (1989) - contains "Mirror, Mirror", "Blue Man Down" and "Mr Magic"
 Amazing Stories VII (1990) - contains "The 21-Inch Sun", "Magic Saturday", "You Gotta Believe Me" and "One Amazing Night (Santa '85)"
 Amazing Stories VIII (1990) - contains "The Pumpkin Competition", "Without Diana" and "Fine Tuning"
US VHS series
 Amazing Stories: Book One (1993) - contains "The Mission" and "The Wedding Ring"
 Amazing Stories: Book Two (1993) - contains "Go To The Head Of The Class" and "Family Dog"
 Amazing Stories: Book Three (1993) - contains "Life On Death Row", "The Amazing Falsworth" and "No Day At The Beach"
 Amazing Stories: Book Four (1993) - contains "Mirror Mirror", "Mr Magic" and "Blue Man Down"
 Amazing Stories: Book Five (1993) - contains "The Pumpkin Competition", "Without Diana" and "Fine Tuning"

DVD
Between 2006 and 2009, The Complete First Season was released on DVD in the US, UK, France, Holland, Italy, Scandinavia, Spain and Australia. In 2009, both seasons were released in Germany and Japan only. In Germany both seasons were released as 12 separate DVDs or a complete box set, which was also reissued in 2011. All countries' DVDs contain the original English soundtrack, while Italy, Germany, France, Spain and Japan have a second soundtrack, dubbed in their respective languages.  The second season was never released in any video format in America despite much demand by collectors.

Apple iTunes
On January 8, 2018, Seasons 1 and 2 were released on Apple iTunes in standard definition.

Foreign broadcasts
In 1992, the series was somewhat erratically screened in Britain by BBC1 and BBC2 – billed in the Radio Times as "Steven Spielberg's Amazing Stories" – with episodes airing at any time from early on Sunday morning (such as "The Family Dog") to weekday evenings (like "Such Interesting Neighbors") to very late at night (for instance "Mirror, Mirror"); it later received a more coherent run on Sci-Fi.  Three of the episodes ("The Mission", "Mummy Daddy" and "Go to the Head of the Class") were packaged together as an anthology film and released theatrically in several European countries such as Spain, France (July 10, 1986) or Finland (June 26, 1987), and also in Australia on September 17, 1987. It later appeared on LaserDisc in Japan as Amazing Stories: The Movie shortly afterwards.

Until 2006, the Sci Fi Channel in the United States showed episodes on an irregular schedule. The MoviePlex channel also showed the series as a collection of "movies," which are blocks of three episodes.

US TV movies
 Amazing Stories: The Movie (1992) - contains "The Mission" and "Go to the Head of the Class"
 Amazing Stories: The Movie II (1992) - contains "Santa ('85)", "The Wedding Ring", "Ghost Train" and "The Doll"
 Amazing Stories: The Movie III (1992) - contains "Mummy Daddy", "Family Dog", "Remote Control Man" and "Guilt Trip"
 Amazing Stories: The Movie IV (1992) - contains "Life on Death Row", "Mirror Mirror", "The Amazing Falsworth" and "Vanessa In The Garden"
 Amazing Stories: The Movie V (1992) - contains "The Sitter", "Grandpa's Ghost", "Dorothy and Ben" and "Gershwin's Trunk"
 Amazing Stories: The Movie VI (1992) - contains "The Main Attraction", "Gather Ye Acorns", "You Gotta Believe Me" and "Lane Change"

References

External links
 
 
 

1980s American horror television series
1980s American science fiction television series
1985 American television series debuts
1987 American television series endings
American fantasy television series
Edgar Award-winning works
English-language television shows
NBC original programming
Primetime Emmy Award-winning television series
Television series by Amblin Entertainment
Television series by Universal Television
1980s American anthology television series
Television shows set in Kentucky